Cankili I (died 1565), also known as Segarasasekaram (Jaga Rajasekharam), is the most remembered Jaffna kingdom king in the Sri Lankan Tamil history. He was very active in resisting Portuguese colonial inroads into Sri Lanka. He also inherited his throne via palace intrigues in which number of heirs apparent died under mysterious circumstances. At the end, he was removed from power by a local uprising that led to his son Puviraja Pandaram taking nominal power from him.

Biography
His father, Singai Pararasasegaram, had two principal wives and a number of concubines. His first wife, Rajalaksmi, had two sons, Singhabahu and Pandaram. Singai Pararasasegaram second wife was Valliammal, she bore him Paranirupasingham. Cankili's mother had Cankili and a daughter named Paravai. As part of palace intrigues, Cankili was able to ascend the throne.

Rule 

According to a letter by Andre de Souza, ordered Cankili I on November 1544 the murder of his eldest son for converting to Catholicism. The son was buried on the spot he was killed, where a chapel was built that later on served as the foundation for the construction of the present St. Mary's Cathedral at Jaffna.

Cankili I resisted all contacts with the Portuguese, maintained relationships with Kunjali Marakkar got assistance from and even massacred 600 – 700 Parava Catholics in the island of Mannar who were brought from India to Mannar by the Portuguese to take over the lucrative pearl fisheries from the Jaffna kings. He was removed from power due to a local uprising that led his son Puviraja Pandaram take nominal power. He wielded real power behind the throne until his death in 1565.

Notes

References
 
 

1565 deaths
Kings of Jaffna
Sri Lankan Hindus
Sri Lankan Tamil royalty
Year of birth unknown
16th-century monarchs in Asia